Nemesis is a Bangladeshi rock band formed in 1999 in Dhaka. They are one of the most popular rock bands in Bangladesh. The band rose to mainstream fame in the late 2000s and early 2010s with their hit songs like "Obocheton", "Dhushor Bhabna", "Bir" and "Kobe". They are considered to be one of the pioneers of alternative rock music in Bangladesh. Since 1999, they have released three studio albums. The current line-up includes vocalist Zohad Reza Chowdhury, guitarists Sultan Rafsan Khan, bassist Raquibun Nabi Ratul and drummer Dio Haque.

History

1999-2003: Formation and Early Days
Nemesis was formed in the summer of 1999. Most of the band members had just finished high school and had a lot of spare time in their hands. Saber & Reeshad brought Maher Khan and Yawar Mehboob together to form a band that he wanted to manage. Maher asked his brother Sabin Todamol to play bass setting up as a three piece band. They first performed at New Year's Eve at a rooftop party that Saber arranged. This is where they met Zohad, a school friend of Reeshad & Maher. Zohad joined the band early 2000.

Sabin left the band early 2000, when Yawar brought in his school friend Nandito and his cousin Ratul to play rhythm and bass for the band. Nemesis was officially formed then. The band gigged the local underground scene, building a fan base and recognition as a cover band.

Zohad brought Dio and Omayr to keep the band going when Yawar and Nandito decided to go abroad for their studies in 2002. The band started work on their first album in 2001 and recorded every summer when Yawar and Nandtio were in town. In 2003, Nemesis first single অবচেতন was released on the mixed compilation আগন্তুক II (Agontuk II). This was a massive success for the band and brought Nemesis into the light securing them a record deal with G-Series for their first album.

2004-2005: Onneshon (Explore)
Onneshon was recorded partly at Art of Noise studio and at the home studio of Saidus Sumon. The debut album was released in 2005. Yawar left the band in mid 2005 settling in the UK and Nandito settled in Canada shortly after the album was released. Subsequently, Dio and Omayr joined as permanent members.

With the release of "ধূসর ভাবনা (Gray Idea)" (2006) and "জয়ধ্বনি (Peals of Victory)" the following year, Nemesis also earned mainstream recognition as the singles went on to be included in the Radio Foorti Top 100 Singles of 2006, 2007 & 2008. The track "মৃত্যুছায়া (Shadow of Death)" also got listed in Radio Foorti's Top Songs of 2010.

During the years following their debut in 2005, Nemesis went on performing in numerous concerts and events that largely promoted social awareness and issues amongst other relevant affairs. Of these, the events well worth a mention: "Say No To Drugs" concert in Gulshan Youth Club (2008), "Save the Children" and "Stand up Against Poverty" concerts in the Dhanmondi Amphitheater (2009), "Vote for Sundarban" concert at the Army Stadium organized by BAMBA (2010).

The band has also appeared in several corporate-sponsored events which include the "Banglalink Music Festival", the series of Tribute shows sponsored by BAT as well as many other shows promoting different brands and products. In addition, the group has also performed at the International Club, the American Club and Aurum's New Years event at The Radisson, December 2009.

2006-2011: Tritio Jatra 

The band recorded their second album Tritio Jatra six years later. The first single from the album, "Kobe" (pronounced kôbe) was released in Radio stations earlier in the 2011. They recorded the album in Bengal Studio. In June 2011 they finished recording and mastering the whole album. They managed a record deal with Deadline music (DLM).In late 2011, they released the music video of "Kobe". The music video was produced by Studio Bangi and was premiered at "The Bench" on 4 November 2011.The album was launched at Café 33 in Bailey Road on 23 November.

In mid 2012, crucial members Maher Khan and Omayr Khan left Nemesis, for personal reasons. The fans were shocked to hear the news. Zerif Ahmed and Zeheen Ahmed, sons of Manam Ahmed of band Miles, were brought in to replace them.

Tritio Jatra got nominated for The Best Band Award of 2011 (Popular Choice and Critic), for The Best Sounding Album Award and For Best Music Video Award (Song: kobe. Under Studio Bangi) in Citycell Channel I Music Awards. On 27 February 2013, Nemesis won The Best Band Award of 2011 under Critic choice.

2012-2015: Social activism

Nemesis have participated in different charity shows. Recently they have performed in a charity concert arranged by Bangladesh International Recovery Developments for street children. Half of the money was donated to Savar victims.

In the year 2013, Nemesis played their new song "Ghuri" at RockNation III. The rave response they received led them to recording the song and releasing it as their single. They also released a video for it in which they played live. It has over a hundred and fifty thousand views as of 2016. In 2015, they played another song at Rocknation VI called "Ke Jane Ke Bojhey". In 2016, they released it as a single via the Robi Yonder Music App. It was different from their previous singles as it had a more bluesy vibe than its predecessors. Before the recording, Zerif left the band to study in Malaysia. To fill his position, Nemesis brought in a suitable replacement, Sultan Rafsan Khan from the young and brilliant Groove/Thrash metal band Minerva. They told their fans via Instagram and Facebook that they had started recording a new album. They released snippets from the album and its title via Zohad's Instagram.

2016-2017: Gonojowar 
The new album is called Gonojowar. It was released on 10 May 2017 after long 6 years. The album received positive review from all the fans. With this album they settled with their sound that is now they are more blues rock than alternative and all the band members were happy with the album. The ten songs on the album mark a departure from their older songs in the way that all the songs have a particular and serious meaning behind them. The album can be streamed in iTunes and spotify. On the 20th of January 2018, they performed at a charity concert for the Rohingyas at Sir John Wilson School in Dhaka, called Salvation.

Members 
Present
 Zohad Reza Chowdhury — lead vocals 
 Sultan Rafsan Khan — guitar 
 Raquibun Nabi Ratul — bass guitar 
 Dio Haque — drums 

Past
 Saber Z - manager 
 Reeshad R 
 Faria Ibrahim - keyboards 
 Sabin Khan — bass guitars 
 Yawar Mehboob — drums 
 Nandito Noor — guitars 
 Maher Khan — guitars, vocals 
 Omayr Khan — guitars 
 Zeheen Ahmed — guitars, vocals 
 Zerif Ahmed - guitars 
 Zafir Huq — guitar

Discography

Albums
 Onneshon (2006)
 Tritio Jatra (2011)
 Gonojowar (2017)

EPs 
 Quarantine Sessions (2020)

Singles 
 Dhushor Bhabna
 Ghuri
 Ami
 Konodin
 Tumi,Ami O Bhor

Music videos

References

External links
 Official Facebook Page

Bangladeshi alternative rock groups
Bangladeshi rock music groups